Palazzo Dorell (French: Palais d'Aurel) also known as Bettina Palace, is a 17th-century Palladian palace located in Gudja, Malta.

History
The property was built during the Order of St. John by Count Ignatius Francesco Moscati Falsoni Navarra as a family home and country residence in 1670. The palace was bought in 1760 by Pietro Paolo Falzon d'Aurelle (English: Dorell) Falzon, and is interchangeably named for him and his daughter Marchesa Lady Elisabetta Testaferrata Dorell.

The palace served as the headquarters for the British forces, under General Graham, during the French blockade (1798–1800).

The interior of the building has some of the ceiling covered in frescoes which were painted by Antonio Grech (1758-1819), known as "Naici" (Antonaci).

It was the last building used by the British, with the consent of the owners, before having to leave Malta in 1979 on Freedom Day.

Since the 19th century the place became limitedly open to the public with special permission of the owners, starting from the Patron Lorenzo Galea.

Gardens
The Xlejli Tower and a chapel are located inside the walled private gardens of the property. At the garden one can still find a small cemetery where British armymen who died during the French occupation of Malta are buried. The garden is considerably very large compared to other general houses. It has a French style.

Modern
Today the palace is a private residence and is not open to the public.

The palace is scheduled as a grade 1 scheduled property by the Malta Environment and Planning Authority (MEPA) and listed on the National Inventory of the Cultural Property of the Maltese Islands (NICPMI).

Other Dorell residences
The aristocratic French family d'Aurelle had other notable properties in Malta. The palace should not be confused with Palazzo Bettina in Birgu, nor Casa Dorell in Valletta; which both belonged to the same family once.

Further reading
Dorell
 Cassar Pullicino, Joseph. "The Order of St. John in Maltese Folk-Memory". Melitensia. p. 156.

Old Mdina cathedral survives in many places

Notes

References

Gudja
Buildings and structures completed in the 17th century
National Inventory of the Cultural Property of the Maltese Islands
Dorell
Palladian architecture